Biesterfeld is a subdivision of Lügde, Germany.

Biesterfeld may also refer to:
 Biesterfeld (company), a company of Germany

People with the surname
Yvonne Cormeau or Beatrice Yvonne Biesterfeld, World War II heroine

See also
Lippe-Biesterfeld family